Anaheim Resort Transportation (ART), established in 1998 as the Anaheim Transportation Network (ATN) and formerly known as Anaheim Resort Transit, is a mass transportation provider in the Anaheim Resort area and its environs in Orange County, California, United States. ART uses a fleet of vehicles, including tourist trolleys, to provide access to hotels, malls, and tourist-related enterprises, which are the main destinations connected by the system.

In 2005, Citizens Against Government Waste criticized an earmark for ART from the United States Congress as wasteful spending.

In 2010, Disney contracted with ART to run shuttles from a Disney-owned parking lot and all stations to the Disneyland Resort.

Governance 

ART is owned by the Anaheim Transportation Network, a quasi-government agency organized as a nonprofit corporation. Its board of directors is made up of representatives from hotels, local government, tourist attractions, and other businesses in the Anaheim Resort and Platinum Triangle. Diana Kotler is the executive director of the organization.

Service 

As of 2015, ART operates 21 fixed routes with stops in Buena Park, Costa Mesa, Garden Grove, Santa Ana, Orange, and Anaheim.

Fleet and facilities 
ATN awarded a contract to BYD for 40 K series battery-electric buses in May 2019. Buses to be delivered include 30-foot (K7M), 40-foot (K9M), and articulated 60-foot (K11M) models.

ATN supports operations, maintenance, and administration at the Base Facility, 1354 South Anaheim Blvd. There is an adjacent Parking Facility to support overflow bus parking at 1280 South Anaheim Blvd. 10 revenue vehicles can be parked at the Base Facility, which includes 3 maintenance bays and 2 lifts. The Parking Facility can accommodate 80 revenue vehicles.

See also 
Orange County Transportation Authority

References

External links 
 

Bus transportation in California
Transportation in Anaheim, California
Public transportation in Orange County, California
Disneyland Resort